The internet in Cuba covers  telecommunications in Cuba including the Cuban grassroots wireless community network and Internet censorship in Cuba. 

Since its introduction in the late 1990s, Cuban Internet has stalled because of lack of funding, tight government restrictions, and the U.S. embargo, especially the Torricelli Act. Starting in 2007 this situation began to slowly improve, with 3G data services rolling out island-wide in 2018, and 4G since 2019, albeit through a government-monitored network. On July 29, 2019, Cuba legalized private WiFi in homes and businesses, although one must obtain a permit to have access. According to website DataReportal, in 2022, 68% of the Cuban population had access to the Internet.

History
In September of 1996, Cuba's first connection to the Internet, a 64 Kbit/s link to Sprint in the United States, was established. After this initial introduction, the expansion of Internet access in Cuba stagnated. Despite a lack of consensus on the specific reasons, the following appear to be major factors:

 Lack of funding, owing to the poor state of the Cuban economy after the fall of the Soviet Union and the Cuban government's fear that foreign investment would undermine national sovereignty (in other words, foreign investors putting Cuba up for sale).
 The U.S. embargo, which delayed construction of an undersea cable, and made computers, routers, and other equipment prohibitively expensive and therefore difficult to obtain.
 According to Boris Moreno Cordoves, Deputy Minister of Informatics and Communications, the Torricelli Act (part of the United States embargo against Cuba) identified the telecommunications sector as a tool for subversion of the 1959 Cuban Revolution, and the necessary technology has been conditioned by counter-revolutionaries. The internet is also seen as essential for Cuba’s economic development.

In 2009, President Obama announced that the United States would allow American companies to provide Internet service to Cuba, and U.S. regulations were modified to encourage communication links with Cuba. The Cuban government rejected the offer, however, preferring to work instead with the Venezuelan government. In 2009 a U.S. company, TeleCuba Communications, Inc., was granted a license to install an undersea cable between Key West, Florida and Havana, although political considerations on both sides prevented the venture from moving forward.

About 30 percent of the population (3 million users, 79th in the world) had access to the internet in 2012. Internet connections are through satellite leading the cost of accessing the internet to be high. Private ownership of a computer or cell phone required a difficult-to-obtain government permit until 2008. When buying computers was legalized in 2008, the private ownership of computers in Cuba soared—there were 630,000 computers available on the island in 2008, a 23% increase over 2007). Owing to limited bandwidth, authorities gave preference to use from locations where Internet access is used on a collective basis, such as in work places, schools, and research centers, where many people have access to the same computers or network.

The ALBA-1 undersea fiber-optic link to Venezuela was laid in 2011 and became operational for public users in January 2013.  This replaced a system which relied on the Intersputnik satellite system and aging telephone lines connecting with the United States. Total bandwidth between Cuba and the global internet before the cable was just 209 Mbit/s upstream and 379 downstream.

In 2015, the Cuban government opened the first public wi-fi hotspots in 35 public locations. It also reduced prices and increased speeds for internet access at state-run cybercafés. As of July 2016, 4,334,022 Cubans (38.8% of the total population) were Internet users.

By January 2018, there were public hotspots in approximately 500 public locations nationwide providing access in most major cities, and the country relies heavily on public infrastructure whereas home access to the Internet remains largely inaccessible for the general population. In 2018, the state announced a plan to start offering mobile Internet by the end of the year. That began in December 2018, and during 2019, limited 4G coverage began.

The 2,500-kilometre Arimao undersea cable reached land on January 10, 2023 in Martinique, after starting its installation in Cienfuegos, Cuba. The Cuban Telecommunications Company S.A. (ETECSA) and the French company Orange S.A. cooperated in laying the cable.

Status

On July 29, 2019, Cuba legalized private Wi-Fi in homes and businesses, although one must obtain a permit to have access.

As of December 6, 2018, Cubans can have full mobile Internet access provided by Cuba's telecommunications company, ETECSA, at 3G speeds. The roll out of the internet service took place from Thursday, December 6, to Sunday, December 9 to avoid congestion. ETECSA also announced different internet packages and their prices, ranging from 600 MB for 7 Cuban convertible pesos ($7) to 4 GB for 30 Cuban convertible pesos ($30).

One network link connects to the global Internet and is used by government officials and tourists, while another connection for use by the general public has restricted content. Most access is to a government-controlled national intranet and an in-country e-mail system. The intranet contains the EcuRed encyclopedia and websites that are supportive of the government. Such a network is similar to the Kwangmyong used by North Korea, a network Myanmar uses and a network Iran has plans to implement.

Starting on 4 June 2013 Cubans can sign up with ETECSA, the state telecom company, for public Internet access under the brand "" at 118 centers across the country. The Juventud Rebelde, an official newspaper, said new areas of the Internet would gradually become available.

In early 2016, ETEC S.A. began a pilot program for broadband Internet service in Cuban homes, with a view to rolling out broadband Internet services in private residences. And there are approximately 250 WiFi hotspots around the country.

In mid December 2016 Google and the Cuban government signed a deal allowing the internet giant to provide faster access to its data by installing servers on the island that will store much of the company's most popular content. Storing Google data in Cuba eliminates the long distances that signals must travel from the island through Venezuela to the nearest Google server.

Since 2018, access to the Internet by mobile data is available. In 2019, 7.1 millions of Cubans could access the Internet. The prices of connections, since WiFi zones, or mobile data, or from houses through the "Nauta Hogar" service have been decreasing, specially since the economic reform of January 2021, when all the salaries increased by at least 5 times, and the prices of the Internet remain in the same point. In 2021, 7.7 millions of Cuban people accessing the Internet were reported.

SNET 
SNET (from Street Network) is a Cuban grassroots wireless community network which allows people to play games or pirate movies by using interconnected network of households.

In May 2019, Cuba's Ministry of Communication (MINCOM) announced resolutions that made community networks like SNET illegal. Since SNET was the world's largest community network that did not have Internet access, implementation of the resolutions was postponed for 60 days for negotiations between SNET administrators and MINCOM. The negotiations have ended with a decision to transfer SNET's services and content to ETECSA, Cuba's government-monopoly ISP, and to provide access through Cuba's nationwide chain of 611 Youth Computer Clubs (YCCs).

Censorship

Cuba has been listed as an "Internet Enemy" by Reporters Without Borders since the list was created in 2006. The level of Internet filtering in Cuba is not categorized by the OpenNet Initiative due to lack of data.

The mobile internet in Cuba being provided by ETECSA, Cuba's telecommunications company, is mostly uncensored. However, a few sites funded by the U.S. government are blocked.

References

Further reading
Tamayo, Juan O. "Cuba’s new Internet locales remain conditioned." Miami Herald. June 6, 2013.
Baron, G. and Hall, G. (2014), Access Online: Internet Governance and Image in Cuba. Bulletin of Latin American Research. doi: 10.1111/blar.12263

External links 

 "Internet politics in Cuba", Carlos Uxo, La Trobe University, Telecommunications Journal of Australia, Vol. 60, No. 1 (February 2010)
 Article on the state of the Internet in Cuba, "An Internet Diffusion Framework", by Larry Press, Grey Burkhart, Will Foster, Seymour Goodman, Peter Wolcott, and Jon Woodard, in Communications of the ACM, Vol. 41, No. 10, pp 21–26, October, 1998
 "Cuban bibliography", lists fourteen reports and articles on the Internet in Cuba from 1992 to 1998, by Larry Press, Professor of Information Systems at California State University
"Internet in Cuba"  Thousands of articles about and referring to the Internet in Cuba.
Public places with Wi-Fi access  provided by ETECSA (Empresa de Telecomunicaciones de Cuba S.A.) in Spanish.
Wifi Nauta hotspots in Cuba a comprehensive lists of Nauta hotspots in Cuba (in Spanish).
La Red Cubana—a blog on Cuban Internet technology, policy and applications (in English).
OFFLINE a documentary about the lack of internet in Cuba. From Cuba by Yaima Pardo. (Video) (English CC)
"Public access to the Internet"  (Spanish), Telecommunications Company of Cuba SA (ETECSA).